Frank Sydney Box (29 April 1907 – 25 May 1983) was a British film producer and screenwriter, and brother of British film producer Betty Box. In 1940, he founded the documentary film company Verity Films with Jay Lewis.

He produced and co-wrote the screenplay, with his then wife director Muriel Box, for The Seventh Veil (1945), which received the 1946 Oscar for best original screenplay.

Sydney and Muriel married in 1935, had a daughter Leonora the following year, and divorced in 1969.

Gainsborough Studios
The couple were then hired by the Rank Organisation to run Gainsborough Studios. They disapproved of the Gainsborough melodramas which had been the studio's major successes for several years, and switched production to a broader range of more "realistic" films with mixed results. Box made 36 films at Gainsborough, which was merged into the Rank Organization in 1949. In 1951 he founded his own production company London Independent Producers with William MacQuitty.

Box ended his cinema career in 1958 to concentrate on working in television. He was part of a consortium that launched the ITV franchise, Tyne Tees Television in 1959.

Selected filmography
Screenwriter and producer
 29 Acacia Avenue (1945)
 The Seventh Veil (1945)
 The Years Between (1946)
 A Girl in a Million (1946)
 The Happy Family (1952)
 Street Corner (1953)
 Too Young to Love (1959)

Producer
 Country Town (1943)
 Don't Take It to Heart (1944)
The Brothers (1947)
The Happy Family (1952)
The Beachcomber (1954)
Eyewitness (1956)
The Truth About Women (1957)
Subway in the Sky (1959)

Films as Head of Gainsborough
The Man Within (1947)
The Brothers (1947)
Dear Murderer (1947)
The Upturned Glass (1947)
Holiday Camp (1947)
Jassy (1947)
When the Bough Breaks (1947)
Easy Money (1948)
Snowbound (1948)
Miranda (1948)
Broken Journey (1948)
Good-Time Girl (1948)
The Calendar (1948)
My Brother's Keeper (1948)
The Blind Goddess (1948) 
Quartet (1948)
Here Come the Huggetts (1948)
Portrait from Life (1948)
Vote for Huggett (1949)
The Bad Lord Byron (1949)
It's Not Cricket (1949)
A Boy, a Girl and a Bike (1949)
The Huggetts Abroad (1949)
Marry Me! (1949)
Christopher Columbus (1949)
Helter Skelter (1949)
Don't Ever Leave Me (1949)
The Lost People (1949)
Diamond City (1949)
Boys in Brown (1949)
Traveller's Joy (1949)
The Astonished Heart (1950)
So Long at the Fair (1950)
Trio (1950)

Selected plays
 The Seventh Veil (1951)

References

External links

1907 births
1983 deaths
Best Original Screenplay Academy Award winners
English film producers
English male screenwriters
People from Beckenham
20th-century English screenwriters
20th-century English male writers
20th-century English businesspeople